Millis was a railroad station in Millis, Massachusetts. It served the Millis Branch (formerly the West Medway Branch), and opened in 1886.

History

Slightly under a year later, on April 21, 1967, the Millis and Dedham branches were both abandoned due to continued poor ridership. By that time, the station had been used as the town hall for several years. Millis station is still extant, one of only two stations on the Millis Branch (the other being ) to have survived; it is now known as the Lansing Millis Memorial Railroad Station, part of the Millis Center Historic District.

References

External links

MBTA Commuter Rail stations in Norfolk County, Massachusetts
Former MBTA stations in Massachusetts
Buildings and structures in Millis, Massachusetts
Railway stations in the United States opened in 1886
Railway stations closed in 1967
1886 establishments in Massachusetts
1967 disestablishments in Massachusetts